Vejle Amt (English Vejle County) is a former county (Danish: amt) on the east coast of the Jutland peninsula in southern Denmark. The county was abolished effective January 1, 2007, when it was divided between Region Midtjylland (i.e. Region Central Jutland) and Region of Southern Denmark. Vejle became the seat of the latter region.

List of County Mayors

Municipalities (1970-2006) 

Brædstrup municipality
Børkop municipality
Egtved municipality
Fredericia municipality
Gedved municipality
Give municipality
Hedensted municipality
Horsens municipality
Jelling municipality
Juelsminde municipality
Kolding municipality
Lunderskov municipality
Nørre-Snede municipality
Tørring-Uldum municipality
Vamdrup municipality
Vejle municipality

Notable sites
The Jelling stones are archaeological treasures erected by Harald Bluetooth to honour his parents.  Encyclopædia Britannica considers the runic inscriptions the best known in Denmark.

The Haraldskær Woman is a bog body interred in about 500 BC, discovered in a peat bog with a remarkable state of preservation.

Citations

Former counties of Denmark (1970–2006)
Central Denmark Region
Region of Southern Denmark